Annadale, also spelled as Annandale is a locality of Shimla city, in the Indian state of Himachal Pradesh. It is a flat valley bottom which includes the helipad as well as a golf course in the city. Annadale has also an army cantonment with an Army Heritage Museum. Due to its lush green environment, historical importance and first seen place by every VVIP visit, it is also known as the "Heart of Shimla".

Etymology
The region in which Annadale is located was first documented in 1834, in the East Indian United Service Journal. When British officers saw the area for the first time, they found it similar to the Annandale valley in Dumfriesshire or County of Dumfries in Scotland, and decided to name it after the Scottish location because most of the officers hailed from the Scotland's Annandale.

According to another story, Charles Pratt Kennedy, the political agent of the British government who was assigned to find a suitable place in India for selecting the Summer Capital, came to Shimla hills in 1822. He was so impressed by the beauty of the dale that he named it after "Anna" his lady love back in England. It is perhaps for this reason, that it has been spelt as both 'Annandale' and 'Annadale' in documents pertaining to Shimla.

History

British Raj
Annadale was first used by East India Company and then the British Raj, which is why natives originally called it "Company Ka Baag". It was a place of enjoyment and entertainment for the British, offering fancy dress shows, picnics, and birthday celebrations. Every year a National Championship of Polo was organised there. Cultural and social festivals were organised there including Gymkhana, fete champetre and sports such as polo and cricket. Under the British Army, the grounds were also used for training and parades. A funfair was organised in September 1833 to raise funds for setting up a school at Sabathu for native girls. In 1839, the first Fancy fair was organised there.

The Durand Football Tournament was started in 1888 in Annadale by Mortimer Durand. It was interrupted during World War 1 and World War 2. The venue was shifted to Delhi in 1940.

British officers appreciated the nature and scenic charm of the site and protected it from disturbance by grotesque structures. During the 1924 gymkhana, a shed was built without proper permission of the municipal committee, who later questioned it. The Annadale Gymkhana committee, in its explanation, replied,

After independence
Gymkhana, polo, football, hockey, cricket matches, and other cultural and social festivals were organised in Annadale after independence. Dussehra was the main event organised, attracting people from the city, but in 1972 a clash between army and police created enmity between the military and civil administration. After this incidence, the event was shifted to Jakhu Temple. Another major event was the 1971 plenary session of the All India Congress Committee. In addition, a national women's field hockey championship was also organised there. A Yajna was organised by Gayatri Parivar in 1994.

In 2006, the Army established a war museum on the periphery of the ground.

Geography 

Annadale is located 2 km away from Shimla Railway Station. Annadale lies exactly below Kaithu locality. The area is situated between lush green mountains and Deodar trees. If The Ridge is taken as a center point then as the Jakhu is on the steep slope up on the hill at the distance of 1.6 km and Annadale is down the hill from The Ridge at the distance of 3.2 km. Annadale has spread from the forest area of Glen, area below Himachal Pradesh Legislative Assembly to Gol Pahadi near Kashyap Niwas.

Importance of the ground 

The Annadale ground is the wide flat valley bottom which is situated in a valley bottom. It is a scenic ground which can be seen from many hilltop locations of the city.

Golf course 

The Annadale ground also has a golf course, making it the only one in the city.

Helipad 
Annadale Ground has a lot of importance in the city mainly due to its lead serving helipad. Every VIP or celebrity lands there whenever they come to Shimla, because Shimla Airport is 20 km away from the main city. Only The President of India usually lands at Kalyani helipad in Chharabra because of the President's retreat location is there.

Disaster management purposes 
The Ground has been used by Indian Army for Disaster management purposes since the past. The ground has been used for conducting various disaster relief and management exercises mainly because Shimla and its adjoining areas are earthquake prone. Annadale Ground has the strategic significance for the Army from the national security perspective. The ground's significance for disaster management was witnessed in 2011 Sikkim earthquake.

Landmarks

Army Heritage Museum 

The Army Heritage Museum in Annadale was established in 2006. It contains historical weapons, arts and many war memory objects. It is located close to the Annadale ground near the forest area.

Shri Ram Mandir
Annadale has Shri Ram temple near Annadale Chowk.

Gan Devta Mandir (Devra Mandir)
Gan Devta temple or Devra temple is the temple dedicated to the family deity of the locals and it is one of the oldest temples in Shimla, it is located near Army Heritage Museum.

Controversy 
Annadale got in controversy during 2005 to 2012, when Himachal Pradesh Government wanted to make an International Cricket Stadium here, but Indian Army refused this by saying that it would damage the scenic charm and nature of the valley and because of all this the situation became a bit controversial. In 2011 government made an idea to ask the people of Shimla about this decision, in which the board was placed on The Ridge, on which the people who support this concept had to sign on the board. Most people supported this by signing on the board, but still government had to accept the Army's demand by cancelling the plan, then the plan was shifted to Dharamshala.

References 

Tourist attractions in Shimla